Immunoglobulin-binding protein 1 is a protein that in humans is encoded by the IGBP1 gene.

Function 

The proliferation and differentiation of B cells is dependent upon a B-cell antigen receptor (BCR) complex. Binding of antigens to specific B-cell receptors results in a tyrosine phosphorylation reaction through the BCR complex and leads to multiple signal transduction pathways.

Interactions 

IGBP1 has been shown to interact with PPP4C, PPP6C and PPP2CA.

References

Further reading